Charles E. Nichols House is a historic home located at Lowell, Lake County, Indiana.  It was built in 1902, and is a -story, Queen Anne style brick dwelling with a cross hipped roof.  It features a stately corner tower with conical roof, side bay windows, and a bracketed balcony over the front entrance.  Also on the property is a contributing carriage house.

It was listed in the National Register of Historic Places in 2010.

References

Houses on the National Register of Historic Places in Indiana
Queen Anne architecture in Indiana
Houses completed in 1902
Buildings and structures in Lake County, Indiana
National Register of Historic Places in Lake County, Indiana